Maya Island Air (also known as Maya Airways) is an airline with its head office on the second floor of Building #1 of Belize City Municipal Airport in Belize City, Belize. It operates regular scheduled flights to 11 destinations within Belize and chartered flights to Mexico, Guatemala, and Honduras. Its main base is the Philip S. W. Goldson International Airport.

History 

The airline was formed and started operations in 1962 as Maya Airways. It was established to succeed the government-owned British Honduras Airways, a BWIA subsidiary, which had ceased operations in 1961. In December 1997 Maya Airways and Island Air merged to form Maya Island Air. In November 2007 all airlines from Belize lost their permission to land in Guatemala due to Guatemala's upgrade to category 1. Later on, Maya Island Air flew to Guatemala again. From July 8, 2009, to May 2011, it also flew Belize City-Cancun.

Destinations 
Maya Island Air operates the following services (at November 2018):

Belize
Belize City (Philip S. W. Goldson International Airport and Belize City Municipal Airport)
Caye Caulker
Caye Chapel
Corozal
Dangriga
Placencia
Punta Gorda
San Pedro Town
Savannah Station (Stann Creek District)

Fleet

The Maya Island Air fleet consists of the following aircraft:
3 Britten-Norman BN2A Islander
1 Cessna 182S
8 Cessna 208B Caravan
1 Gippsland GA-8 Airvan

Accidents and incidents
 December 4, 2007, a Maya Island Air Cessna 208B Caravan V3-HFS was taking off from Corozal Airport for a flight to San Pedro Airport, when the pilots aborted takeoff but were not able to stop the airplane on the remaining runway. The Grand Caravan struck a barbed wire fence and ran into several orange trees before coming to a halt some 520 feet beyond the runway. The undercarriage was sheared off and the airplane sustained substantial damage to the belly. None of the 12 passengers and crew were killed or injured in the accident.

References

External links

Maya Island Air

Airlines of Belize
Airlines established in 1962
Belize City
1962 establishments in British Honduras
Belizean brands